Thalara is a former village development committee that is now a Rural Municipality in Bajhang District in Sudurpashchim Province of western Nepal. It lies on the Seti River. Thalara is made with its former VDCs, Dangaji, Parakatne, Kot Bhairab, Koiralakot and Malumela.

References

Populated places in Bajhang District